The following selected statistics about ethnic groups living in Norway have been extracted from the results of the Norwegian census.

Average income for couples with children

Listed in Norwegian kroner

Home ownership percentage

Percentages that have been given penalty from Norwegian court

Percentage of people under 67 unable to earn for a living

Higher Education Ages from 19-24

Employees by immigrant groups

listed in percentage for all ages

Number of reported sick

listed in percentage days of valid sick report given from doctor

References

External links
 http://ssb.no/emner/02/aktuell_befolkning/200002/ab20002.pdf
 http://www.ssb.no/emner/02/sa_innvand/sa66/
 http://www.ssb.no/emner/00/02/notat_200466/notat_200466.pdf

Demographics of Norway
Population statistics
Norway-related lists